Emily Stone may refer to:
 Em Stone or Emily Stone (born 1978), illustrator
 Emma Stone or Emily Jean Stone (born 1988), actress
 Emily Stone (mathematician)